The Church of the Redeemer is an Anglican church in Toronto, Ontario, Canada. The small church is prominently located at the intersection of Bloor Street and Avenue Road, near the Royal Ontario Museum. It was founded in 1871 when the area was still on the fringe of the city. The Gothic Revival style building opened on June 15, 1879.

Overview

 
As with many other downtown churches, the Church of the Redeemer suffered from falling attendance in the late twentieth century. The church ran into severe financial difficulties and, in 1979, the parish voluntarily disestablished itself and was taken over by the Anglican Diocese of Toronto. The church lands were sold to developers and the massive Four Seasons Renaissance Centre was built on them.

With the money from this deal, the church was again solvent and regained its independence. The money also paid for much needed renovations. In 2000, the church launched a major renovation project as extra meeting space and offices were constructed under the building.

The church is known for its progressive stance on social issues, especially gay rights. In 1998, the congregation published An Honourable Estate: Same Sex Unions and the Church, advocating the blessing of same-sex unions. Integrity Toronto worships in the church. The parish uses exclusively the Book of Alternative Services.

The church is noted by passersby for its prominent sign, often featuring a quotation or thought for meditation. The church is also known to host a range of musical events and concerts. For example, Canadian group Great Lake Swimmers played two shows at the Church of the Redeemer on April 14, 2007.

See also

List of Anglican churches in Toronto

References

External links

Official website

Redeemer
Religious organizations established in 1871
Redeemer
Redeemer
Redeemer
Gothic Revival architecture in Toronto
19th-century churches in Canada